Hockey Club Express (Ekspres) are an ice hockey team based in Lviv, Ukraine. They are currently playing in the Western Ukrainian Amateur Hockey League.

References

Ice hockey teams in Ukraine
Sport in Lviv